Mona Canyon (Spanish: Cañón de la Mona) is an 87-mile long (140 km) submarine canyon located in the Mona Passage, between the islands of Hispaniola (particularly the Dominican Republic) and Puerto Rico, with steep walls measuring between 1.25 and 2.17 miles (2-3.5 km) in height from bottom to top. The Mona Canyon stretches from the Desecheo Island platform, specifically the Desecheo Rift, in the south to the Puerto Rico Trench, which contains some of the deepest points in the Atlantic Ocean, in the north. The canyon is also particularly associated with earthquakes and subsequent tsunamis, with the 1918 Puerto Rico earthquake having its epicenter in the Mona Rift along the submarine canyon.

Geomorphology 
The Mona submarine canyon geomorphology is highly complex yet unexplored. The complex seafloor is the result of oceanographic and tectonic forces that are actively forming and reshaping the landscape of the region. The canyon is located in an intricate and irregular tectonic region at the boundary between the Caribbean and North American plate tectonics, where east–west transversing subduction Septentrional Fault ends in an approximately 1,000-meter-deep hole west of the landform.

See also 
List of submarine canyons

References 

Canyons and gorges of the United States
Geography of Puerto Rico
Landforms of Puerto Rico
Physical oceanography
Submarine canyons of the Atlantic Ocean